Chahe is a town in Pizhou, Jiangsu. , it administers the following twelve villages:
Chahe Village
Xihuangshi Village
Qiaonan Village
Qiaobei Village
Linqiao Village
Mazhuang Village
Yangdun Village
Yanchu Village
Shengjia Village
Liangbi Village
Dongshazhuang Village
Maji Village

References

Pizhou
Township-level divisions of Jiangsu